Chondrorrhina abbreviata is a species of fruit and flower chafers belonging to the family Scarabaeidae, subfamily Cetoniinae.

Description
The basic color of the body is black. Elytra show a large transversal yellow band.

Distribution
This species occurs in West Africa (Senegal, Gambia & Ivory Coast).

Bibliography
 Scarabs: World Scarabaeidae Database. Schoolmeesters P., 2011-05-30
 Fabricius J.C. (1792) Entomologia systematica emendata et aucta. Secundum Classes, Ordines, Genera, Species adjectis Synonymis, Locis, Observationibus, Descriptionibus, Hafniae. C. G. Proft & fils 1:1-538
 Kraatz G. (1880) Genera nova Cetonidarum, Entomologische Monatsblätter 2:17-30
 Massouroudin Akoudjin,  Jean César, Appolinaire Kombassere. Jérémy Bouyer  Spatio-temporal variability of fruit feeding insects used as ecological indicators in West Africa
 Ruter, G., 1975 Contribution to the biological study of northern senegal part 28 coleoptera cetoniidae. Bulletin de l'Institut Fondamental d'Afrique Noire Serie A Sciences Naturelles 37(3): 661-668
 Sakai, Kaoru; Nagai Shinji (1998) The Cetoniine Beetles of the World. In: Fujita, Hiroshi (ed.) Mushi-sha's Iconographic Series of Insects, vol.3, 422pp (144 color plates).

References

Beetles of Africa
Cetoniinae
Beetles described in 1792